Fernando Herrera (died 1518) was a Roman Catholic prelate who served as Bishop of Gaeta (1506–1518).

Biography
On 4 November 1506, Fernando Herrera was appointed by Pope Julius II as Bishop of Gaeta.
He served as Bishop of Gaeta until his death in 1518.

References

External links and additional sources
 (for Chronology of Bishops) 
 (for Chronology of Bishops) 

16th-century Italian Roman Catholic bishops
Bishops appointed by Pope Julius II
1518 deaths